Sredka may refer to:

 Sredska, Kosovo
Sredska, Kardzhali Province, Bulgaria